Bounthanom Vongphachanh (born November 9, 1980 in Vientiane, Laos) is a Laotian former swimmer, who specialized in sprint freestyle events. Vongphachanh qualified for the men's 50 m freestyle at the 2004 Summer Olympics in Athens, by receiving a Universality place from FINA in an entry time of 28.45. He challenged seven other swimmers in heat two, including 15-year-old Malique Williams of Antigua and Barbuda. He posted a lifetime best of 28.17 to earn a third spot by a 1.42-second margin behind winner Anderson Bonabart of Micronesia. Vongphachanh failed to advance into the semifinals, as he placed seventy-seventh overall out of 86 swimmers in the preliminaries.

References

External links
 

1980 births
Living people
Laotian male freestyle swimmers
Olympic swimmers of Laos
Swimmers at the 2004 Summer Olympics
People from Vientiane